Vasile Lehaci is a Romanian sprint canoer who competed from the late 1980s to the early 1990s. He won three silver medals at the ICF Canoe Sprint World Championships (C-2 1000 m: 1990, C-2 10000 m: 1986, 1990).

References

Living people
Romanian male canoeists
Year of birth missing (living people)
ICF Canoe Sprint World Championships medalists in Canadian